Jacek Bayer (born 29 December 1964 in Poland) is a Polish retired footballer.

Career

Bayer was nicknamed "Duży" (Big) because he played with his little brother Dariusz at Jagiellonia, who was "Mały" (Little).

Initially he found it hard to adjust after leaving third division Hetman Białystok for Jagiellonia but regained his confidence by scoring four goals in three friendlies.

While still playing in the second division in 1987, Bayer was called up to the national team for a Euro qualifier against Cyprus. However, he failed to seize his chance, hitting the crossbar in the 0-0 draw, and was the last player from the second division to feature internationally for Poland.

References

External links
 Jacek Bayer at 90minut

Polish footballers
Living people
1964 births
Association football forwards
Poland international footballers
Sportspeople from Białystok
Jagiellonia Białystok players
Hetman Białystok players
Widzew Łódź players
Siarka Tarnobrzeg players